Squalius kosswigi is a species of ray-finned fish in the family Cyprinidae. It is endemic to the Tahtali River in Turkey.

References

Squalius
Fish described in 1972